Rondebosch is one of the Southern Suburbs of Cape Town, South Africa. It is primarily a residential suburb, with shopping and business districts as well as the main campus of the University of Cape Town.

History
Four years after the first Dutch settlement at the Cape in 1652, the first experimental crops were grown along the banks of the Liesbeek River (at that stage called the Amstel or Versse Rivier). In October 1656, Jan van Riebeeck visited Rondeboschyn, whose name derived from a contraction of Ronde Doorn Bossien, meaning a circular grove of thorn trees.  In 1657, the first group of Dutch East India Company employees gained "free burgher" (free citizen) status and were granted land along the river in the area now known as Rondebosch.

Geography
Rondebosch lies between the slopes of Devil's Peak in the west and the M5 freeway in the east; it is one of the Southern Suburbs of Cape Town, which lie along the eastern slope of the Table Mountain massif. The suburb's western border with the Table Mountain National Park is defined by the M3 freeway. To the north are the suburbs of Rosebank and Mowbray, while to the south are Newlands and Claremont. The eastern border of Rondebosch is the M5 freeway; beyond the freeway are Sybrand Park, Athlone and Rondebosch East.

The Southern Line railway divides Rondebosch in two; the only road within Rondebosch that crosses the railway is the Belmont Road bridge. Main Road (the M4) runs north-south through the area west of the railway, while Campground Road runs in the same direction east of the railway. The third north-south through route is Milner Road, further east close to the M5.

The area around the intersection of Main Road and Belmont Road is Rondebosch's main commercial area, with several small shopping malls and two supermarkets. Also located in this area is Rondebosch railway station, which is the main public transport facility in the suburb. A smaller commercial area lies just to the east on the corner of Belmont and Campground Roads; there is also a row of shops along Belvedere Road in the southeastern part of the suburb. The rest of the suburb is used for educational and residential purposes, with the residential areas being generally denser further to the west where the influence of the University of Cape Town is felt.

Two canalised streams run from the slopes of Table Mountain through Rondebosch; the Liesbeeck River runs northwards between Main Road and the railway, while the Black River runs in a northeasterly direction through the eastern part of the suburb. The terrain is generally flat east of the railway line, while to the west it slopes upwards towards Devil's Peak.

Landmarks

On the slopes of Devil's Peak above Rondebosch is the main campus of the University of Cape Town.

The historic Groote Schuur estate in Rondebosch includes presidential and ministerial residences with Cape Dutch origins. The Groote Schuur building is the biggest, rebuilt by Cecil Rhodes according to a design by Herbert Baker after a fire in 1896.  The presidential residence, Genadendal (formerly Westbrooke), also dates back to Cape Dutch times.

The home of Simon van der Stel (first governor of the Cape Colony) is now part of Rustenburg Junior School. This building dates back to the 17th century, although it has undergone many alterations over the years. Its summer house, dating from 1760, remains as a monument just below the university.  Other historic buildings in the area include the Rondebosch Town Hall, now occupied by the Rondebosch Library, and St. Paul's Church, which was designed by Charles Collier Michell.

Rondebosch Common, once a military campground, is a national monument and an important fynbos conservation area.

The Baxter Theatre in Rondebosch is Cape Town's second biggest theatre complex, after the Artscape Theatre Centre in the city centre.

Rondebosch Fountain 

The historic centre of Rondebosch is the Main Road, with the Victorian cast iron Rondebosch Fountain being a historic landmark. Originally known as the Moodie Fountain, it was one of South Africa's first electric streetlights.  It was built by the Saracen Foundry in Glasgow and presented to the community by George Moodie as a gift in 1891. The lamp was first turned on, on 25 April 1892 and was initially powered by Moodie's private power plant until a municipal power plant on the Liesbeeck River was completed. The fountain was destroyed in a road accident in 2015 but is being rebuilt.

Government and politics
Rondebosch is in the City of Cape Town municipality, within the Protea Sub-Council (Sub-Council 20). The eastern part of the suburb is within ward 58 and the ward councillor is Sharon Cottle, and the western part is in ward 59 with councillor Ian Iversen, both members of the Democratic Alliance.

Rondebosch was the parliamentary seat of Sir De Villiers Graaff, the leader of the opposition United Party, and later that of Frederik van Zyl Slabbert, leader of the opposition Progressive Federal Party.

Education
The western part of Rondebosch is dominated by the main campus of the University of Cape Town. Rondebosch is also notable for a high density of schools.  Originally the Rondebosch Town Hall the Rondebosch Public Library is a notable landmark in the neighbourhood.

Sports and recreation
Western Province Cricket Club is the largest sports facility in Rondebosch, catering for many different sports, including tennis and hockey. The University itself has facilities for most sports. Other facilities include Rondebosch Golf Club and Rygersdal Football Club. Next door to Rondebosch is Newlands, home to the Newlands Stadium for rugby and soccer, and Newlands Cricket Ground.

Parks in Rondebosch include Keurboom Park and Rondebosch Park. Rondebosch Common is also a popular recreational area.

Demographics
According to the 2011 census, 14,591 people live in Rondebosch. 62.7% described themselves as "White", 16.5% as "Black African", 9.6% as "Coloured" and 6.1% as "Indian or Asian". The predominant language is English, which is the first language of 84.3% of the population. 7.6% speak Afrikaans and 1.8% speak Xhosa.

In the second half of the 20th century, Rondebosch was a whites-only area in terms of the Group Areas Act, an Apartheid law that enforced segregation.

References

External links

 Rondebosch Golf Club
 Western Province Cricket Club

 
Suburbs of Cape Town